The Glorious Adventure is a lost 1918 American silent drama film directed by Hobart Henley.

Plot
As described in a film magazine, at the death of her aunt Carey Wethersbee (Marsh) decides to go visiting. In a distant town she decides to make the home of Hiram A. Ward (Standing), wealthy mill owner, her stopping place. That Mr. Ward is not pleased is evidenced in his every action towards her, but finally he comes to regard the young woman as a pleasure, and before long he falls in love with her. Because of his cruel treatment of his employees, Carey does not glory in his proposal and, after his factory has been blown up and he seeks to prosecute an innocent man, Carey returns to her home. Shortly after, Hiram, realizing that Carey is right, adjusts his methods of dealing with his people and goes to Carey to explain everything and to win her heart.

Cast
Mae Marsh as Carey Wethersbee
Wyndham Standing as Hiram A. Ward
Sara Alexander as Lucretia Wethersbee, Carey's Aunt
Paul Stanton as Bob Williamson
Alec B. Francis as Scott, the Butler
Mabel Ballin as Lucretia, as a Girl
A. Voorhees Wood as Cabman
Ivan Christy as Joe
Mammy Lou as Old Servant
Gladys Wilson (Undetermined Role)
Irene Blackwell (Undetermined Role)

Production
The film was directed by Hobart Henley, and starred Mae Marsh and Wyndham Standing. The film also featured an elderly black woman, Mammy Lou, who claimed to be 114 years old at the time of filming. Art direction for the film was by Hugo Ballin.

The film was produced by Samuel Goldwyn, based on the short story "When Carey Came to Town" by Edith Barnard Delano, and released by Goldwyn Pictures. The film was filmed partly on location at the Hermitage Plantation in Savannah, Georgia.

This film is not to be confused with another film of the same title, directed in England in 1922 by J. Stuart Blackton in the Prizmacolor process. Neither film is related to the famous book The Glorious Adventure (1927) by Richard Halliburton.

Preservation status
A print existed in MGM's Vault #7, but was destroyed by a fire in 1965.

See also
List of lost films

References

External links

Progressive Silent Film List: The Glorious Adventure at silentera.com

1918 drama films
American silent feature films
American black-and-white films
Goldwyn Pictures films
Silent American drama films
Lost American films
1918 lost films
Lost drama films
1910s American films
1910s English-language films